Zolazepam (Flupyrazapon) is a pyrazolodiazepinone derivative structurally related to the benzodiazepine drugs, which is used as an anaesthetic for a wide range of animals in veterinary medicine. Zolazepam is usually administered in combination with other drugs such as the NMDA antagonist tiletamine or the α2 adrenergic receptor agonist xylazine, depending on what purpose it is being used for. It is around four times the potency of diazepam (0.32 mg/kg versus 1.2 mg/kg in animal models) but it is both water-soluble and un-ionized at physiological pH meaning that its onset is very fast.

Zolazepam was developed by Horace A. de Wald and Donald E. Butler for Parke-Davis and was the result of a very detailed analysis of the benzodiazepine structure ( filed in 1969).

Zolazepam, in combination with tiletamine, has been used in the tranquilization of wild animals, such as gorillas and polar bears, and has been found to be superior to ketamine because of reduced side-effects. A 1:1 mixture of zolazepam and tiletamine is sold under the names Telazol and Zoletil.

See also 
Benzodiazepine

References 

General anesthetics
GABAA receptor positive allosteric modulators
Lactams
Fluoroarenes
Pyrazolodiazepines
Veterinary drugs